Hisonotus depressinotus is a species of catfish in the family Loricariidae. It is native to South America, where it occurs in the Tietê River basin. The species reaches 3 cm (1.2 inches) SL. It is not to be confused with the related species Hisonotus depressicauda, which has a similar name and is found in the same river basin.

References 

Otothyrinae
Fish described in 1918
Fish of South America